Asha Kelunni Nair (born 8 July 1966), better known by her stage name Revathi, is an Indian actress and director, known for her works predominantly in Tamil and Malayalam cinema - in addition to Telugu, Hindi and Kannada films.
She has won several accolades, including the National Film Awards in three different categories, and six Filmfare Awards South. She has also won the Kerala State Film Award for Best Actress for her performance in Bhoothakaalam (2022).

Early life
Revathi was born as Asha Kelunni Nair in Cochin (present-day Kochi) to Malank Kelunni Nair, a major in the Indian Army, who hails from Palakkad, and Lalitha Kelunni.

When she was in school, she took part in a fashion show. Group photos were taken during the show and a photo was chosen to be the cover of a popular Tamil magazine. This happened to be her photo, which was seen by the director Bharathiraja, who at that time was on the lookout for a new heroine for his latest venture, Mann Vasanai.

Career

She made her acting debut with the Tamil film Mann Vasanai in 1983. The film was a silver jubilee hit and she was rewarded with a Filmfare Special Award – South. She then made her Malayalam film debut with the movie titled Kattathe Kilikkoodu in 1983. This film too hit the gold at the box office and was among her biggest hits of the 1980s. . She was introduced to Telugu film industry with 1984 films, Seethamma Pelli by director Bapu  and  Manasa Veena. The later movie was dubbed into Malayalam, with the name Thennal Thedunna Poovu.Revathy went on to play a blind, rape-survivor Seetha in Tamil in Mahendran’s Kai Kodukkum Kai (1984) opposite Rajinikanth. Revathy went on to play Seetha in Pudhumai Penn (1984) directed by Bharathiraja. The same year she also did Vaidehi Kathirunthal, directed by R. Sundarrajan.

She was versatile in her choice of roles and often played strong, relatable women characters. Her big break, the one that put her name high on the charts, was her portrayal of Divya, a very spirited and headstrong girl who transforms into a woman through the course of the movie, in Mani Ratnam’s Mouna Ragam (1986).

She was cast opposite Kamal Haasan in Punnagai Mannan in 1986. Revathi won several accolades for her role in the film. The film too was a huge hit and established her as one of the most sought after actress of Tamil film industry. She finally won her first Best Actress Award for her splendid performance in the Malayalam film Kakkothikkavile Appooppan Thaadikal in 1988. She won her Best Actress Award for Tamil film industry with the film titled Kizhakku Vaasal in 1990. She gave hits after hits and gave one of her finest performance in Priyadarshan’s Malayalam film Kilukkam (1991). In 1991, she had made her debut in Hindi with Suresh Krissna’s Love, co-starring Salman Khan. She then won a National Film Award under the category of Best Supporting Actress for her Tamil film Thevar Magan in 1992. She was at the peak of her career in the early 1990s. She also gave occasional appearance in Telugu and Kannada films as well. Revathy again won the Filmfare Award in Balu Mahendra’s Marupadiyum (1993). The golden run lasted until the end of the 1990s, after appearing in some of her most well-regarded films in that decade Anjali (1990), Thevar Magan (1992), Magalir Mattum (1994) were already behind her. She has also won the Tamil Nadu State Film Award Special Prize for Thalaimurai in 1998.

In addition to acting, Revathi has directed two features (Mitr, My Friend and Phir Milenge) and contributed an episode each to the anthology films Kerala Cafe and the unreleased Mumbai Cutting.

Hindi audiences have savoured Revathi in Margarita with a Straw (2014) and 2 States (2014). In Tamil, Pa Paandi (2017); Jackpot (2019) and in Malayalam Virus (2019).

She was seen in the bilingual Telugu and Hindi film Major (2022), where she portrayed Major Sandeep Unnikrishnan's mother, Dhanalakshmi.

Personal life
Revathi married cinematographer and director Suresh Chandra Menon in 1986. The couple didn't have any children. However, following differences between them, they started living separately from 2002 and were granted divorce on 23 April 2013 by Chennai Additional Family Court.

In 2018, she revealed that she has a five-year old biological daughter named Mahee through In Vitro Fertilisation.

In the media
Revathi is a trained Bharatanatyam dancer, having studied since the age of seven and performed her arangetram in Chennai in 1979. She has been considered one of the all-time top actresses of Tamil cinema and South Indian cinema. She was one of the  most successful leading actresses of South Indian cinema. Revathi was the only South Indian actress of 80s and 90s to win the Filmfare best actress award in Tamil, Telugu and Malayalam, including three consecutive wins in Tamil.  Apart from films, Revathi has been involved in a variety of social organisations, the most notable being the Banyan, Ability foundation, Tanker foundation and Vidyasagar, and has also served as a member of several film festivals including the Chennai International Film Festival and the International Film Festival of India.

Awards

References

External links

 
 
 

Living people
Actresses in Tamil cinema
21st-century Indian film directors
20th-century Indian actresses
Actresses from Kochi
Actresses in Kannada cinema
Actresses in Hindi cinema
Actresses in Telugu cinema
Indian film actresses
Indian women film directors
Hindi-language film directors
Actresses in Malayalam cinema
Tamil Nadu State Film Awards winners
Filmfare Awards South winners
Malayalam film directors
Best Supporting Actress National Film Award winners
Actresses in Malayalam television
Indian television actresses
Television personalities from Tamil Nadu
1966 births
21st-century Indian actresses
Indian voice actresses
Film directors from Kochi
Television personalities from Kerala
Actresses in Tamil television
Actresses in Telugu television
Women artists from Kerala
Tamil television directors
Tamil television writers